was a Japanese landing craft depot ship operated by the Imperial Japanese Army (IJA). The vessel did not have a flight deck like her sister ship .

Design features
Nigitsu Maru was a passenger liner taken over before completion and refitted by the Imperial Japanese Army.

On 9 January 1944 Nigitsu Maru left Palau for Ujina in convoy FU-901 as the sole merchant ship escorted by the destroyer . She carried about 2,000 troops, mainly soldiers of the 12th Independent Engineer Regiment. Three days later off the Okino-Daito Island, southeast of Okinawa, Nigitsu Maru was attacked by the US submarine  which fired four torpedoes from the surface. Amagiri picked up the survivors and landed them in Japan.

Notes

References
 

Ships built by IHI Corporation
1942 ships
Amphibious warfare vessels
Ships sunk by American submarines
Maritime incidents in January 1944
World War II shipwrecks in the Pacific Ocean